Tur (Tur 1) is a light infantry mobility vehicle designed by the Polish factory AMZ-Kutno in 2007. The Tur was designed for intervention and patrol tasks behind front lines, specially equipped for operations in dangerous areas. It has a 5 person transport capacity.

Design
The vehicle was developed especially for the Polish military contingents in Iraq and Afghanistan in response to requests of the soldiers stationed there. It may be fitted with a remote turret. Mechanical part comes mostly from IVECO (engine, transmission, suspension).

It is designed as a safer and more modern alternative to the Humvee operated by the Polish Army. Despite needs of military contingents, as for 2009 no orders were made, and a contest for a light armoured patrol car (LOSP in Polish) was not  settled (its main counterpart is Iveco LMV). As of 2008, five prototypes were made, two of them were destroyed in tests. The last, fifth one has modified look of a forward part, and minor improvements. In 2008 AMZ-Kutno developed new, bigger variant Tur 2, being a different car in fact.

Engine
 Type: Iveco Aifo 4-cylinders, turbocharger and intercooler, Common Rail
 Capacity: 
 Power: 122 kW (166 PS)

Technical specification

 Gearbox: manual with 6 forward and 1 reverse gears
 Permanent 4 wheel drive mechanism
 Clutch: Hydraulic, dry, single disk
 Reduction gear and transfer case allow to use 24 gear ratios: 12 for road drive and 12 for off-road
 Fuel tank: 
 Range:

Vehicle ballistic armouring
 Protecting crew against armor-piercing Incendiary bullet: 7.62×39mm API BZ (Level 2 - STANAG 4569)
 Protecting crew against armor-piercing bullet: 7.62×54mmR B32 AP (Level 2 - STANAG 4569)
 Protecting crew against explosive material equal  of TNT (Level 2b - STANAG 4569)
 Engine protected by armoured steel plate FB6 class

Vehicle dimensions and weight
 Gross vehicle weight rating (GVWR): 
 Payload: 
 Wheel base: 
 Track width: 
 Total length: 
 Height:  (to the roof level)
 Total width: .
 Fording depth (without preparation): 
 Crew: 5

See also
 Dzik - armoured car

References

External links

 TUR ad producers site
  TUR on TVN24(the  Polish 24-hour news TV channel of TVN group) video.

Armoured cars of Poland
Armoured personnel carriers of Poland
All-wheel-drive vehicles
Military trucks
Off-road vehicles
AMZ vehicles
Military light utility vehicles
Wheeled armoured personnel carriers